Yaniel Velázquez Garcia (born 12 July 1987 in Havana) is a Cuban modern pentathlete. He won a silver medal for the men's event at the 2007 Pan American Games in Rio de Janeiro, Brazil, which earned him a qualifying place for the Olympics, with an impressive score of 5,344 points.

At the 2008 Summer Olympics in Beijing, Velazquez became the nation's first pentathlete to compete in the men's event. During the competition, he made a strong start in the early segments, but struggled to maintain his position in the entire event, when he set the slowest time of 2:16.38 in freestyle swimming. He managed to attain fair scores for horse riding and cross-country running; however, these were insufficient for him to place near the top, placing fifteenth out of thirty-six competitors in the men's event, with a total score of 5,292 points.

References

External links
UIPM Profile
NBC 2008 Olympics profile

Cuban male modern pentathletes
1987 births
Living people
Olympic modern pentathletes of Cuba
Modern pentathletes at the 2008 Summer Olympics
Sportspeople from Havana
Pan American Games silver medalists for Cuba
Pan American Games medalists in modern pentathlon
Modern pentathletes at the 2015 Pan American Games
Medalists at the 2007 Pan American Games
20th-century Cuban people
21st-century Cuban people